Hong Kong Futsal League is the official futsal league held by Hong Kong Football Association, established in 2010. For sponsorship reasons it is known also as the Jockey Club Futsal League.

Top Division Teams in 2018–19
List from HKFA 
 Wong Tai Sin
 Resources Capital FC
 Tuen Mun
  Mutual
  Pak Hei
  Hoi King
  Eastern District

References

External links 
 NIKE Futsal League 2010-2011 - Hong Kong Football Association
 2018-2019 Jockey Club Futsal League - Hong Kong Football Association

Hong
Sports leagues established in 2010
2010 establishments in Hong Kong
Futsal in Hong Kong
Football leagues in Hong Kong